James Madison Burns (August 9, 1845 – October 30, 1910) was a Union Army soldier and officer during the American Civil War. He received the Medal of Honor for gallantry during the Battle of New Market Virginia on May 15, 1864. The original medal is on exhibit at the Virginia Museum of the Civil War located on the battlefield.

Following the war, Burns was commissioned as a second lieutenant in the US Army, eventually reaching the rank of lieutenant colonel. He also served in the Indian Wars and the Spanish–American War, until retiring due to disability in 1899.

Medal of Honor citation
"The President of the United States of America, in the name of Congress, takes pleasure in presenting the Medal of Honor to Sergeant James Madison Burns, United States Army, for extraordinary heroism on 15 May 1864, while serving with Company B, 1st West Virginia Infantry, in action at New Market, Virginia. Under a heavy fire of musketry, Sergeant Burns rallied a few men to the support of the colors, in danger of capture and bore them to a place of safety. One of his comrades having been severely wounded in the effort, Sergeant Burns went back a hundred yards in the face of the enemy's fire and carried the wounded man from the field."

See also

 List of Medal of Honor recipients
 List of American Civil War Medal of Honor recipients: A–F

References

External links
 Military Times Hall of Valor
 

1845 births
1910 deaths
People from Jefferson County, Ohio
People of Ohio in the American Civil War
People of West Virginia in the American Civil War
Union Army officers
United States Army Medal of Honor recipients
American Civil War recipients of the Medal of Honor